Xiangyang–Jingmen high-speed railway, or Xiangyang–Jingmen section of Hohhot–Nanning high-speed railway, is a high-speed railway line in Hubei, China.

Construction began in September 2022.

Route 
The line will approximately follow the existing Jiaozuo–Liuzhou railway between Xiangyang and Jingmen.

Stations

References 

High-speed railway lines in China
Rail transport in Hubei